Buenos Aires plateada (English language: Silver-Plated Buenos Aires) is a 2000  Argentine black-and-white film drama directed and written by Luis Barone with Luis Alberto Asurey.

The film premiered on October 5, 2000 in Buenos Aires.

Plot
A television director has made the initial chapter of a TV series based on his own life history and wants to put it to the air. For it he looks for the support of two old friends, with whom he once a politician and held an important position in the government in the past.

But they have other stronger commitments and the program pilot does not excite them. He then puts then in scene a history where nothing is what it seems.

Cast
 Luis Luque
 Mausi Martínez
 Rubén Stella
 Norberto Díaz
 Manuel Callau
 Alejandro Awada
 Ricardo Merkin
 Fabiana García Lago
 Carlos Perciavalle
 Fernando Siro
 Luis Ziembrowsky

External links
 

2000 films
Argentine black-and-white films
2000 drama films
Argentine independent films
2000s Spanish-language films
Films set in Buenos Aires
2000 independent films
Argentine drama films
2000s Argentine films